The 2001 NFL season was the 82nd regular season of the National Football League (NFL), and the second season of the 21st century. The league permanently moved the first week of the regular season to the weekend following Labor Day. In the wake of the September 11 attacks, the NFL's week 2 games (September 16 and 17) were postponed and rescheduled to the weekend of January 6 and 7, 2002. To retain the full playoff format, all playoff games, including Super Bowl XXXVI, were rescheduled one week later. The New England Patriots won the Super Bowl, defeating the St. Louis Rams 20–17 at the Louisiana Superdome.

This is the last season with 31 teams as the Houston Texans were introduced as an expansion team the following season.

Player movement

Transactions
July 27: The San Francisco 49ers sign quarterback Ricky Ray. Ray would go on to a career in the Canadian Football League.

Trades
July 20: The New Orleans Saints trade Robert Arnaud to Washington.

Retirements
April 9, 2001: Three-time Super Bowl champion Troy Aikman announces his retirement, after failing to find another team.

Draft
The 2001 NFL Draft was held from April 21 to 22, 2001 at New York City's Theater at Madison Square Garden. With the first pick, the Atlanta Falcons selected quarterback Michael Vick from Virginia Tech.

Officiating changes
Mike Pereira became the league's director of officiating, succeeding Jerry Seeman, who had served the role since 1991.

Bill Leavy and Terry McAulay were promoted to referee. Phil Luckett returned to back judge, while another officiating crew was added in 2001 in preparation for the Houston Texans expansion team, the league's 32nd franchise, in 2002.

Due to labor dispute, the regular NFL officials were locked out prior to the final week of the preseason. Replacement officials who had worked in college football or the Arena Football League officiated NFL games during the last preseason week and the first week of the regular season. A deal was eventually reached before play resumed after the September 11 attacks.

Major rule changes
 Fumble recoveries will be awarded at the spot of the recovery, not where the player's momentum carries him. This change was passed in response to two regular season games in 2000, Atlanta Falcons–Carolina Panthers and Oakland Raiders–Seattle Seahawks, in which a safety was awarded when a defensive player's momentum in recovering a fumble carried him into his own end zone.
 Taunting rules and roughing the passer will be strictly enforced.

2001 deaths
Jim Benton: A member of the National Football League 1940s All-Decade Team, Benton died on March 28, 2001
Don Boll: A draft pick of the Washington Redskins, Boll died on December 29, 2001.
Jim Cain: A member of the Detroit Lions team that won the 1953 NFL Championship Game
Sam Claphan: Chargers tight end from 1980 to 1987, Claphan died on November 26, 2001.
Neal Colzie: NFL defensive back, Colzie died on August, 20, 2001.
L.G. Dupre: Part of the 1958 NFL Championship Game against the New York Giants, he died after a lengthy battle with cancer on August 9, 2001.
Dan Edwards: Drafted by the Pittsburgh Steelers in the 1st round (9th overall) of the 1948 NFL Draft, Edwards died on August 7, 2001.
Homer Elias: Lions guard from 1978 to 1984, he died of a heart attack on October 3, 2001.
Bob Gaona: NFL offensive lineman who also played defense and special teams, he died on May 23, 2001.
Hank Gremminger: Defensive back for the Packers from 1956 to 1965 and the Los Angeles Rams in 1966, he died of cardiac arrest on November 2, 2001.
Harvey Martin: The co-MVP of Super Bowl XII, he died of pancreatic cancer on December 24, 2001.
Dan Nugent: Redskins guard from 1976 to 1980, Nugent died on October 18, 2001.
Dwayne O'Steen: Part of the Oakland Raiders Super Bowl XV winning team, O'Steen died on September 21, 2001, of an apparent heart attack.
Don Paul: was selected to four Pro Bowls, one as a member of the Cardinals and three as a member of the Browns died on September 7, 2001.
Pete Perreault: A member of the 1968 Cincinnati Bengals season, their inaugural season, Perreault died on December 8, 2001)
Dick Rehbein: Longtime NFL coach who had become Patriots quarterbacks coach in 2000, Rehbein died of cardiomyopathy on August 6, 2001.
Bo Roberson: Roberson caught three passes for eighty-eight yards in the Bills' 23–0 defeat of the Chargers in the 1965 American Football League Championship Game. He died on April 15, 2001.
Tony Samuels: Drafted by the Kansas City Chiefs in the fourth round of the 1977 NFL Draft, Samuels died on September 12, 2001.
Paul Seiler: Former player for the New York Jets, he died of colon cancer on September 25, 2001. 
Billy Ray Smith Sr.: A member of the Baltimore Colts teams that participated in Super Bowl III and Super Bowl V, he died from cancer on March 23, 2001.
Korey Stringer: Former tackle for the Minnesota Vikings died from a heat stroke August 1, 2001, during training camp. Vikings team wore a 77 patch on their jerseys to commemorate Stringer.

Regular season
Following a pattern set in 1999, the first week of the season was permanently moved to the weekend following Labor Day. With Super Bowls XXXVI–XXXVII already scheduled for fixed dates, the league initially decided to eliminate the Super Bowl bye weeks for 2001 and 2002 to adjust.

In the wake of the September 11 attacks, the games originally scheduled for September 16 and 17 were postponed and rescheduled to the weekend of January 6 and 7. To retain the full playoff format, all playoff games, including the Super Bowl, were rescheduled one week later. The season-ending Pro Bowl was also moved to one week later. This was the last season in which each conference had three divisions, as the conferences would be realigned to four divisions for the 2002 NFL season. 

Canceling the games scheduled for September 16 and 17 was considered and rejected since it would have canceled a home game for about half the teams (15 of 31). It would have also resulted in an unequal number of games played: September 16 and 17 was to have been a bye for the San Diego Chargers, so that team would still have played 16 games that season and each of the other teams would have played only 15 games (the Chargers ultimately finished 5–11, making any competitive advantages to playing an extra game irrelevant). 

As a result of rescheduling Week 2 as Week 17, the Pittsburgh Steelers ended up not playing a home game for the entire month of September (their only home game during that month was originally scheduled for September 16). The ESPN Sunday Night Football game for that week was also changed. It was originally scheduled to be Cleveland at Pittsburgh, but it was replaced with Philadelphia at Tampa Bay, which was seen as a more interesting matchup. Ironically, the Eagles and Buccaneers would both rest their starters that night, and would meet one week later in the playoffs. This way of "flexible scheduling" would not be used at all in 2007, and since 2008, it is only used in the final week, except for the 2017 season, when no primetime game was scheduled for Week 17 due to that Sunday falling on New Year's Eve.

The games that eventually made up Week 17 marked the latest regular season games to be played during what is traditionally defined as the "NFL season" (under the format at the time, the regular season could not end later than January 3 in any given year; this changed in 2021, as the NFL expanded to 17 games with the end of the regular season pushed back one week as a result; the 2021 regular season ended on January 9, and under the new format, the latest the regular season could end is January 10).

Another scheduling change took place in October, when the Dallas at Oakland game was moved from October 21 to 7 to accommodate a possible Oakland Athletics home playoff game on October 21. The rescheduling ended up being unnecessary as the Athletics would not make it past the Division Series round.

Scheduling formula

Thanksgiving: Two games were played on Thursday, November 22, featuring Green Bay at Detroit and Denver at Dallas, with Green Bay and Denver winning.

Final regular season standings

Tiebreakers
 New England finished ahead of Miami in the AFC East based on better division record (6–2 to Dolphins’ 5–3).
 Cleveland finished ahead of Tennessee in the AFC Central based on better division record (5–5 to Titans’ 3–7).
 Jacksonville finished ahead of Cincinnati in the AFC Central based on head-to-head sweep (2–0).
 N.Y. Giants finished ahead of Arizona in the NFC East based on head-to-head sweep (2–0).
 New Orleans finished ahead of Atlanta in the NFC West based on better division record (4–4 to Falcons’ 3–5).
 Baltimore was the second AFC Wild Card based on better record against common opponents (3–1 to Jets’ 2–2).
 Green Bay was the first NFC Wild Card based on better conference record (9–3 to 49ers’ 8–4).

Playoffs

Milestones
The following teams and players set all-time NFL records during the season:

* – Sack statistics have only been compiled since 1982.

Statistical leaders

Team

Individual

Awards

All-Pro Team

The following players were named First Team All-Pro by the Associated Press:

Coaching changes
Buffalo Bills – Gregg Williams; replaced Wade Phillips, who was fired following the 2000 season
Cleveland Browns – Butch Davis; replaced Chris Palmer, who was fired following the 2000 season
Detroit Lions – Marty Mornhinweg; replaced interim head coach Gary Moeller, who replaced Bobby Ross who resigned during the 2000 season.
Kansas City Chiefs – Dick Vermeil; replaced Gunther Cunningham, who was fired following the 2000 season
New York Jets – Herman Edwards; replaced Al Groh, who resigned to become the head coach of the University of Virginia.
Washington Redskins – Marty Schottenheimer; replaced interim head coach Terry Robiskie who replaced Norv Turner, who was fired during the 2000 season

Stadium changes
 The Denver Broncos moved from Mile High Stadium to Invesco Field at Mile High, with the investment company Invesco acquiring the naming rights
 The Pittsburgh Steelers moved from Three Rivers Stadium to Heinz Field, with the H. J. Heinz Company acquiring the naming rights

In addition, the AstroTurf at Veterans Stadium was replaced with NexTurf after a preseason game between the Philadelphia Eagles and Baltimore Ravens was canceled for poor field conditions.

Uniform changes
New Orleans Saints – Replaced their gold pants with black pants.
San Diego Chargers – White pants instead of blue with their white jerseys.
St. Louis Rams – New font for uniform numbers.
Chicago Bears – White pants instead of blue with their white jerseys.
Jacksonville Jaguars – Started wearing black shoes with their uniforms.

Following 9/11, every jersey had a patch to remember those who died on that day, while the New York Jets and New York Giants wore a patch to remember the firefighters who died.

Television
This was the fourth year under the league's eight-year broadcast contracts with ABC, CBS, Fox, and ESPN to televise Monday Night Football, the AFC package, the NFC package, and Sunday Night Football, respectively.

Pat Summerall announced that this would be his last season as a full-time NFL broadcaster. This would also be John Madden's last year of commentating on Fox, ending the 21-season Summerall–Madden pairing that dated back since 1981 on CBS. With Matt Millen leaving Fox to become the general manager of the Detroit Lions, the network tapped Daryl Johnston from CBS and the then-recently retired quarterback Troy Aikman to join Dick Stockton as Fox's No. 2 team.

Deion Sanders replaced Craig James as an analyst on The NFL Today.

References

Further reading
 NFL Record and Fact Book
 NFL History 2001– (Last accessed October 17, 2005)
 Total Football: The Official Encyclopedia of the National Football League
 Steelers Fever – History of NFL Rules (Last accessed October 17, 2005)

External links
Football Outsiders 2001 DVOA Ratings and Commentary
Pro Football Reference.com – 2001

National Football League seasons
 
National Football League